The NBL Canada All-Star Game was an exhibition game hosted by the National Basketball League of Canada (NBL). The first edition was held in 2012 and included ten players per team, randomly divided under captains Joey Haywood and Eddie Smith. In the final two editions in 2013 and 2014, players were divided into a Central Division team and an Atlantic Division team. In 2014, the players have decided on the coaches' votes. The game takes place alongside multiple other competitions, together known as All-Star Weekend. These competitions include the Three-Point Long Distance Shootout and the Slam Dunk Championship.

Results

See also 
 List of NBL Canada All-Stars

References 

Recurring sporting events established in 2012
Basketball all-star games
All